Hodges is a town in Greenwood County, South Carolina, United States. The population was 155 at the 2010 census. The mayor is Michael George.

Hodges was named after Major General George Washington Hodges, who was commander of all of South Carolina's militia. Hodges was born September 9, 1792, and died March 24, 1876. He fought in the War of 1812. His grave is northeast of town in a hidden pre-Civil War cemetery.

Geography

Hodges is located in northern Greenwood County at  (34.286835, -82.246260). U.S. Route 178 passes through the center of town, leading northwest  to Anderson. U.S. Route 25 passes just east of the town, leading north  to Greenville and south with US 178  to Greenwood.

Demographics

As of the census of 2000, there were 158 people, 56 households, and 42 families residing in the town. The population density was 201.8 people per square mile (78.2/km2). There were 64 housing units at an average density of 81.7 per square mile (31.7/km2). The racial makeup of the town was 88.61% White, 7.59% African American, and 3.80% from two or more races.

There were 56 households, out of which 30.4% had children under the age of 18 living with them, 62.5% were married couples living together, 12.5% had a female householder with no husband present, and 25.0% were non-families. 23.2% of all households were made up of individuals, and 16.1% had someone living alone who was 65 years of age or older. The average household size was 2.82 and the average family size was 3.40.

In the town, the population was spread out, with 25.9% under the age of 18, 7.0% from 18 to 24, 27.2% from 25 to 44, 24.1% from 45 to 64, and 15.8% who were 65 years of age or older. The median age was 39 years. For every 100 females, there were 116.4 males. For every 100 females age 18 and over, there were 105.3 males.

The median income for a household in the town was $41,563, and the median income for a family was $46,875. Males had a median income of $32,083 versus $33,125 for females. The per capita income for the town was $14,564. About 18.6% of families and 15.2% of the population were below the poverty line, including 14.8% of those under the age of eighteen and 15.8% of those 65 or over.

References

External Links
 The official Facebook page for the Town of Hodges

Towns in Greenwood County, South Carolina
Towns in South Carolina